The 2015 Volta ao Algarve was the 41st running of the Volta ao Algarve road cycling stage race. It was rated as a 2.1 event on the UCI Europe Tour and took place from 18 to 22 February 2015 in the Algarve region of Portugal.

The race consisted of five stages, including one summit finish (at Alto do Malhão) and one Individual time trial.

He took the lead with victory in a solo breakaway on stage 2, then defended his lead with third place in the time trial and fourth place on the summit finish. He ended the race 27 seconds ahead of Kwiatkowski, with Tiago Machado in third place. Thomas also won the points classification; his teammate Richie Porte won the summit finish and also the mountains classification.

In the other classifications, the young riders competition was won by Davide Formolo, Machado won the Portuguese classification and  won the team classification.

Race overview

Stages

Stage 1
18 February 2015 — Lagos to Albufeira, 
The first stage was a  route from Lagos to Albufeira, across generally hilly terrain, though it was expected that the race would end in a bunch sprint.

Brandão was able to gain bonus seconds at both intermediate sprints.

Gianni Meersman won the sprint ahead of Ben Swift and Paul Martens and moved into the race lead. Joni Brandão, having finished on the same time as Meersman, was third in the general classification thanks to the bonus seconds he won.

Stage 2
19 February 2015 — Lagoa to Monchique, 
Stage 2 was a mixed stage: the first part saw the riders riding across gentle hills, but the final part of the  course was much more demanding, with several difficult climbs in the last .

The first major breakaway was formed by Marcel Sieberg, Andreas Schillinger, Fabricio Ferrari, Wesley Kreder and Ivan Balykin. They built a lead of more than five minutes, but were caught in the mountainous portion of the race with more than  remaining on the stage. A second breakaway then attacked, formed of Bakhtiyar Kozhatayev, Jonathan Castroviejo, Ian Boswell, Phil Gaimon and Alberto Gallego. This group was caught before the final climb of the race.

The final climb finished  from the end of the stage. Rein Taaramäe attacked on this climb, before Geraint Thomas launched his own attack. Thomas was able to catch and pass Taaramäe, taking a solo victory by 19 seconds ahead of Taaramäe and 23 seconds ahead of the rest of the lead group. With bonus seconds taken into consideration, Thomas now led the general classification by 30 seconds, as well as leading the points and mountains classifications. His teammate Sebastián Henao led the young riders classification. This was Thomas' first win of the season.

Stage 3
20 February 2015 — Vila do Bispo to Cabo de São Vicente, individual time trial (ITT)
Stage 3 was a  individual time trial from Vila do Bispo to Cabo de São Vicente. Though there were no significant climbs, the route was hilly throughout. There was additional difficulty caused by a headwind. The pre-stage favourite was former world time trial champion Tony Martin, who was wearing the German time trial champion's jersey for the first time in four years.

Adriano Malori, who had won the time trial in the 2015 Tour de San Luis, set an early time of 21' 51". Martin was 10 seconds ahead at the checkpoint halfway along the course, but could not hold this advantage to the finish; he ended up winning the stage by 0.4 seconds from Malori. Geraint Thomas, riding in the yellow skinsuit of the race leader, was ten seconds ahead of Martin at the checkpoint, but faded over the final kilometres to finish three seconds behind Martin and Malori. Defending champion Michał Kwiatkowski was fourth. Thomas therefore increased his race lead, with Martin and Kwiatkowski in second and third.

Stage 4
21 February 2015 — Tavira to Loulé–, 
The first part of the stage was relatively flat, before a difficult final section. This included three difficult climbs in the final , before the summit finish.

The day's main break was formed by Davide Malacarne, Tony Gallopin, Adriano Malori, Maurits Lammertink, Kamil Gradek, Filipe Cardoso and Beñat Txoperena. They gained a lead of over four minutes, while another group attacked from behind. This group included Tony Martin , in second place in the general classification. Both groups were caught before the penultimate climb, when Martin's teammate Zdeněk Štybar, eighth overall, attacked to lead over the climb. Heading into the final climb, however, Thomas was supported by his teammate Richie Porte, whose pace reduced the leading group to nine riders. Porte was then able to attack and take the stage victory. He was three seconds ahead of defending champion Michał Kwiatkowski  and a further three seconds ahead of Ion Izagirre. Thomas finished fourth on the stage to defend his overall race lead.

Stage 5
22 February 2015 — Almodôvar to Vilamoura, 

The fifth and final stage of the race was a  route from Almodôvar to Vilamoura. The first half of the stage was fairly hilly, but the final  were fairly flat.

There was an early break of three riders: Paweł Bernas, Diego Rubio and Imanol Estévez. They were then joined by Heiner Parra. A new break then escaped, made up of Lluís Mas and Beñat Txoperena. They were joined first by Micael Isidoro, and David de la Fuente and then also by Adriano Malori and Jonathan Castroviejo. They were never allowed a significant lead, with  leading the chase on behalf of André Greipel. Greipel was able to win the stage in the bunch sprint, ahead of Tom Van Asbroeck and Raymond Kreder. Kreder, however, was relegated for improper sprinting and third place on the stage went to Rüdiger Selig. None of the classifications changed hands in the final stage, so Geraint Thomas won the overall victory in the race.

Classification leadership table
In the 2015 Volta ao Algarve, five different jerseys were awarded. For the general classification, calculated by adding each cyclist's finishing times on each stage, and allowing time bonuses for the first three finishers at intermediate sprints and at the finish of mass-start stages, the leader received a yellow jersey. This classification was considered the most important of the 2015 Volta ao Algarve, and the winner of the classification was considered the winner of the race.

Additionally, there was a points classification, which awarded a green jersey. In the points classification, cyclists received points for finishing in the top 10 in a mass-start stage. For winning a stage, a rider earned 25 points, with 20 for second, 16 for third, 13 for fourth, 10 for fifth, 8 for sixth, 6 for seventh, 4 for eighth, 2 for ninth and 1 for tenth place. Points towards the classification could also be accrued at intermediate sprint points during each stage; these intermediate sprints also offered bonus seconds towards the general classification. There was also a mountains classification, the leadership of which was marked by a blue jersey. In the mountains classification, points were won by reaching the top of a climb before other cyclists, with more points available for the higher-categorised climbs.

The fourth jersey represented the young rider classification, marked by a white jersey. This was decided in the same way as the general classification, but only riders born after 1 January 1992 were eligible to be ranked in the classification. The fifth jersey represented the Portuguese rider classification, marked by an orange jersey. This was calculated in the same manner as the general classification, calculated by adding each Portuguese cyclist's finishing times on each stage. There was also a classification for teams, in which the times of the best three cyclists per team on each stage were added together; the leading team at the end of the race was the team with the lowest total time.

References

External links

Volta ao Algarve
Volta ao Algarve
Volta ao Algarve